Stan White (born August 14, 1971) is a former American football quarterback.

Football career

High school and college
A graduate of W. A. Berry High School in Hoover, Alabama. He went on to play quarterback at Auburn University where he started every game from his freshman year until his senior year, a total of 45 straight games. He was named permanent team captain on Auburn’s undefeated 1993 team that went 11–0 and was also named to Auburn’s Team of the Decade for the 1990s.

NFL
White was signed by the New York Giants as a free agent in 1994 and remained with the team until 1997.

WLAF
In 1997, he was allocated by the Giants to the London Monarchs of the World League of American Football (WLAF).

Retirement
White returned home to Birmingham in 1998 and then owned a State Farm Insurance and Financial Services Agency in Birmingham, and is currently a diamond dealer in New York.

In 2001 White became the radio color commentator for the Auburn Network's football broadcasts. Stan White retired from being the color man for the Auburn radio football broadcast on 11/30/22. White also makes appearances around the South as a public speaker, along with Jay Barker.

On August 30, 2011, White became co-host of a daily morning drive time sports call in show with Alabama broadcaster Eli Gold on WZNN in Birmingham, Alabama.

References

1971 births
Living people
American color commentators
American football quarterbacks
American motivational speakers
Auburn Tigers football players
Auburn Tigers football announcers
London Monarchs players
New York Giants players
Players of American football from Birmingham, Alabama